Trifluorosilane (silicon trifluoride) is the chemical compound with the formula F3HSi. At standard temperature and pressure, trifluorosilane is a colorless gas. Note that the free radical F3Si is often also referred to as trifluorosilane.

Preparation
Trifluorosilane has been purified and separated by low-temperature high-vacuum distillation. One preparation method involves products of the reaction between SbF3 and HSiCl3. HSiCl3 is obtained by copper catalyzed reaction between HCl and Silicon at 200-400 °C.

Formation has also been reported in certain etching operations of silicon.

Properties
The electric dipole moment of trifluorosilane is 1.26 debye. The length of the silicon to fluorine bond is 1.555 Å, Si-H length is 1.55 Å, and ∠FSiF is 110°.

References

Further reading
  

Fluorides
Nonmetal halides
Silanes